Hsieh Pei-chen (born 31 January 1988) is a Taiwanese badminton player. She won gold medal at the 2010 World University Championships in the mixed doubles event partnered with Chen Hung-ling.

Achievements

East Asian Games 
Women's doubles

Mixed doubles

Summer Universiade 
Women's doubles

Mixed doubles

World University Championships 
Women's doubles

Mixed doubles

Asian Junior Championships 
Mixed doubles

BWF Grand Prix 
The BWF Grand Prix has two levels, the BWF Grand Prix and Grand Prix Gold. It is a series of badminton tournaments sanctioned by the Badminton World Federation (BWF) since 2007.

Women's doubles

  BWF Grand Prix Gold tournament
  BWF Grand Prix tournament

BWF International Challenge/Series 
Women's doubles

Mixed doubles

  BWF International Challenge tournament
  BWF International Series tournament
  BWF Future Series tournament

References

External links 
 

1988 births
Living people
Sportspeople from Taipei
Taiwanese female badminton players
Badminton players at the 2010 Asian Games
Badminton players at the 2014 Asian Games
Asian Games competitors for Chinese Taipei
Universiade silver medalists for Chinese Taipei
Universiade bronze medalists for Chinese Taipei
Universiade medalists in badminton
Medalists at the 2011 Summer Universiade
Medalists at the 2015 Summer Universiade
21st-century Taiwanese women